Rodrigo Bernal González (born June 6, 1959 in Medellín) is a Colombian botanist who specialises in the palm family.  Bernal was a faculty member at the Institute of Natural Sciences, National University of Colombia until 2007.  He received his Ph.D. from the University of Aarhus, Denmark, in 1996. He was general curator of the National Colombian Herbarium (1986-1987), and editor of the scientific journal Caldasia (1989-1991, 1997-1999).

Bernal has published five books and 105 scientific papers and book chapters, most on them on palm systematics, ecology, uses and conservation.  He has described one new genus (Sabinaria) and 25 new species of palms in the genera Aiphanes, Astrocaryum, Bactris, Chamaedorea, Geonoma, Oenocarpus, Sabinaria, Socratea, and  Wettinia. He has described also new species in the plant families Cyclanthaceae, Sapindaceae, and Caprifoliaceae.

Bernal coauthored a Field Guide to the Palms of the Americas and a field guide to the palms of Colombia (2010). Bernal is also coauthor of Common Names of Plants in Colombia, an online dictionary of over 18,000 common names applied to plants in Colombia, which provides information on the distribution of each name, and its corresponding scientific name. Since 2001 he has coordinated the production of the Catalogue of the Plants of Colombia , a checklist of the ca. 30,000 plant species occurring in Colombia. The production of this work involves 171 botanists in 19 countries. Since 2007 Bernal has been involved in building up the National Collection of Colombian Palms, an initiative to gather living specimens of all native Colombian palms at the Quindío Botanic Garden, in Calarcá. In 1996 he received the Sciences Award of the Fundación Alejandro Angel Escobar  for In 1996 for the Field guide to American palms (co-authored by Andrew Henderson & Gloria Galeano Garcés).

Books
 Aprovechamiento sostenible de palmas colombianas. Editorial Universidad Nacional de Colombia. Instituto de Ciencias Naturales-Universidad Nacional de Colombia, Bogotá. 244 pp. 
 Galeano, G. & R. Bernal. 2010. Palmas de Colombia. Guía de Campo. Editorial Universidad Nacional de Colombia, Bogotá. 688 pp. 
 Henderson, A., G. Galeano and R. Bernal. 1995. Field Guide to the Palms of the Americas.  Princeton University Press, Princeton, New Jersey.  352 pp., 256 photos, 553 maps. 
 Galeano, G. y R. Bernal. 1987.  Las Palmas del Departamento de Antioquia. Región Occidental.  Universidad Nacional de Colombia, Centro Editorial, Bogotá.

New species of plants discovered

Arecaceae
 Aiphanes acaulis  – Principes 29(1): 20. 1985
 Aiphanes argos  – Phytotaxa 298(1): 66. 2017
 Aiphanes bicornis  – Caldasia 26(2): 433 (-437; fig. 1). 2004
 Aïphanes buenaventurae  – Caldasia 32(1): 117 (-119; fig. 1a-b). 2010
 Aiphanes graminifolia  – Caldasia 24(2): 277 (-280; fig. 1). 2002
 Aïphanes multiplex  – Caldasia 32(1): 119 (-121; fig. 2). 2010
 Aiphanes pilaris  – Caldasia 23(1): 163 (2001)
 Aiphanes spicata  – Fl. Neotrop. Monogr. 70: 78. 1996
 Aiphanes tricuspidata  – Brittonia 41: 156, fig. 1989
 Astrocaryum triandrum  – Candollea 43(1): 279 (1988)
 Bactris rostrata  – Caldasia 24(2): 280 (-283; fig. 2). 2002
 Chamaedorea ricardoi  – Palms 48(1): 27 (-29; fig. 1). 2004
 Geonoma santanderensis  – Caldasia 24(2): 282 (-284; fig. 3). 2002
 Geonoma wilsonii  – Caldasia 24(2):284 (-290; figs. 4-5). 2002
 Oenocarpus makeru  – Brittonia 43(3): 158 (1991)
 Oenocarpus simplex  – Brittonia 43(3): 154 (1991)
 Sabinaria  – Phytotaxa 144: 28. 2013
 Sabinaria magnifica  – Phytotaxa 144: 34
 Socratea montana  – Brittonia 38(1): 55 (1986)
 Wettinia aequatorialis  – Caldasia 17(82–85): 369 (1995)
 Wettinia disticha  – Caldasia 17(82–85): 368 (1995)
 Wettinia lanata  – Caldasia 17(82–85): 371 (1995)
 Wettinia minima  – Caldasia 17(82–85): 373 (1995)
 Wettinia oxycarpa  – Caldasia 13(65): 695 (1983)

Cyclanthaceae
 Asplundia harlingiana  – Caldasia 14: 27 (-28). 1984.
 Asplundia sanctae-ritae  – Caldasia 14: 28 (-29). 1984. 
 Asplundia sarmentosa  – Caldasia 14: 29 (-30). 1984. 
 Dicranopygium fissile  – Caldasia 14: 31, figs. 1984.
 Dicranopygium scoparum  – Caldasia 14: 32, figs. 1984.

Sapindaceae
 Paullinia trifoliolata  – Caldasia 26(1): 61-64; fig. 1. 2004

Caprifoliaceae
 Valeriana neglecta  – Kew Bull. 64(4): 723 (-725; fig. 1).2010

Plants named after Bernal
 Dichapetalum bernalii  – Brittonia 40(4): 441, f. 1. 1988. (Dichapetalaceae)
 Chigua bernalii  – Memoirs of the New York Botanical Garden 57: 170, f. 1I. 1990. (Zamiaceae)
 Orphanodendron bernalii  – Brittonia 42(4): 249-253, f. 1-2. 1990. (Fabaceae)
 Anthurium bernalii  – Aroideana 32: 45–48, 5a–d. 2009. (Araceae)
 Geonoma bernalii  – Phytotaxa 17: 38. 2011. (Arecaceae)
Cyperus bernalii  – Phytotaxa 362 (3): 287–291. 2018. (Cyperaceae)

References

1959 births
Living people
20th-century Colombian botanists
People from Medellín
21st-century Colombian botanists